Sokullu is a Turkish surname. Notable people with the surname include:

 Sokullu Mehmed Paşa, (1506 – October 11, 1579) an Ottoman grand vizier of the 16th century
 Sokullu Ferhad Paşa, (died 1586) was an Ottoman general and statesman from Bosnia, who was the first beylerbey of Bosnia
 Sokulluzade Hasan Paşa, (? - 1602) was an Ottoman officer and the son of Sokollu Mehmet Pasha
 Sokulluzade Lala Mehmed Paşa, ( ? - June 21, 1606) a Bosnian Ottoman statesman, who may have been a cousin of Sokollu Mehmed Pasha
 Ömer Can Sokullu, (August 14, 1988 - ) a Turkish football midfielder

Turkish-language surnames